The G class is a series of container ships built for OOCL. With a maximum theoretical capacity of 21,413 TEU they were the largest container ships in the world when they were built and the first ships with a capacity larger than 21,000 TEU. They took the title of largest container ships from Madrid Maersk (20,568 TEU).

The ships have 24 container bays. Containers can be placed 23 wide on deck and 21 wide below deck.

History 
In April 2015 Samsung Heavy Industries announced it had received an order from OOCL to build six container ships of 21,100 TEU for a total cost of 950 million USD. The first ship, the OOCL Hong Kong, was christened on 12 May 2017. 

On 18 October 2017 the OOCL Japan suffered a mechanical failure while traversing the Suez Canal, causing the ship to run aground. She was quickly pulled free by tugs and was able to continue her maiden voyage to Europe.

The same thing happened again less than a year later. On 6 June 2018 the OOCL Japan again suffered a steering failure while in the Suez Canal. This time she struck the embankment causing damage to a road.

List of ships

See also 

 OOCL M-class container ship

References 

Container ship classes
Ships built by Samsung Heavy Industries
Ships of the Orient Overseas Container Line